Subterranean(s) or The Subterranean(s) may refer to:

 Subterranea (geography), underground structures, both natural and man-made

Literature 
 Subterranean (novel), a 1998 novel by James Rollins
 Subterranean Magazine, an American fantasy, horror and science fiction magazine
 Subterranean Press, an American small press publisher
 The Subterraneans, a 1958 novella by Jack Kerouac

Media (film and TV) 
 The Subterraneans (film) 1960 motion picture based on the Kerouac novella
 The Subterranean, a 1967 Romanian film
 Subterranean (TV program), an American music show which ran from 2003 to 2011

Music 
 Subterranean (EP) (1995), an EP by In Flames
 "Subterranean" (2003), a song by Smack
 "Subterranean" (2014), a song by Foo Fighters on the album Sonic Highways
 Subterranean Records, an American record label
 "Subterraneans" (1977), a song by David Bowie
 "Subterraneans" (1984), a song by Flesh for Lulu
 Subterraneans (band), an English art-rock band

See also 
 
 Subterranea (disambiguation)
 Underground (disambiguation)